The Indies Choice Book Award (formerly known as Book Sense Book of the Year 2000-2008) is an American literary award that was inaugurated at BookExpo America 2000. The American Booksellers Association (ABA) rededicated the award (previously known as the ABBY) in recognition of a new era in bookselling, as well as the important role the Book Sense Picks List has played for independent booksellers in discovering and spreading the word about books of quality to all stores, and readers, nationwide. Throughout the year, Book Sense independent booksellers from across the country nominate for inclusion in the monthly Book Sense Picks the books that they most enjoyed hand-selling to their customers. The books on each list represent a combined national and local staff pick selection of booksellers' favorites from more than 1,200 independent bookstores with Book Sense.

The award was renamed the Indies Choice Book Award in 2009. The winners are announced in conjunction with The E.B. White Read Aloud Award

Award winners and honor books

Picture Book Hall of Fame

See also

Book Sense
American Booksellers Association
Independent bookstore

References

External links
Indies Choice Book Awards, official website.
Book Sense Book of the Year, official website.

American literary awards
Awards established in 2009